Aplidium albicans is a toxic sea squirt native to the Mediterranean Sea.

Range
Native to the Mediterranean Sea. Population density is sparse in its native range.

Toxins
A. albicans contains aplidine (aplidin, plitidepsin), found by Steiner et al 2015 and Borjan et al 2015 to be a cytotoxin (due to its apoptotic effect) and antiangiogenic. The toxin is structurally and functionally almost identical to toxins produced by the genus Tistrella of marine bacteria.

Aquaculture
Aquaculture of A. albicans has not been economically feasible .

References

Enterogona
Poisonous animals